Kalwar is a village in Kannod Mandal, a part of Dewas district in the Indian state of Madhya Pradesh.

References

Villages in Dewas district